The 1834 Illinois gubernatorial election was the fifth quadrennial election for this office.  U.S. Representative Joseph Duncan was elected by a majority of the voters. He defeated former Lt. Governor William Kinney and former state treasurer Robert K. McLaughlin. Kinney had run in the election before as well.
This was the only election of a Whig Governor in Illinois history.

Results

See also
 Illinois state capitol referendum, 1834

References
Illinois Blue Book 1899

Illinois
1834
Gubernatorial
August 1834 events